Flight 648 may refer to:
 Aerolineas Argentinas Flight 648, hijacked on 28 September 1966
 EgyptAir Flight 648, hijacked on 23 November 1985

0648